Brahmanandam Drama Company  is a 2008 Telugu film starring Sivaji, Ravi Krishna, Brahmanandam and Kamalinee Mukherjee. The film is directed by E. Srikanth Nahatha and produced by: Palli Kesava Rao and K. Kishore Reddy. The film is a Telugu remake of Hindi film Bhagam Bhag, which itself is the official remake of the 1995 Malayalam film Mannar Mathai Speaking with comedy sequences and sub plot borrowed from another 1987 Malayalam film Nadodikkattu.

Plot
Anandam runs a drama company. Vasu, Srinu, Soni are the heroes and heroine of the drama company. The company gets a chance to perform in Bangkok and the heroine gives them a hand. Anandam announces that whoever gets the heroine will become the hero in the company. From there on the film takes several twists as the duo are in pursuit of a heroine and strange circumstances follows.

Cast
Sivaji as Vasu
Ravi Krishna as Sreenu
Brahmanandam as Anandam 
Kamalinee Mukherjee as Arpitha
Samiksha as Soni
Ali
Jeeva
Raghu Babu
Ravi Babu
Gundu Hanumantha Rao
Ranganath
Sivaji Raja
Dharmavarapu Subramanyam
Amanchi Venkata Subrahmanyam

Soundtrack 
Music by Sai Karthik.

References

External links

2008 films
2000s Telugu-language films
Telugu remakes of Malayalam films
Telugu remakes of Hindi films
Films scored by Sai Karthik